Rumen Dimitrov Hristov (born 27 December 1955) is a Bulgarian politician from the Union of Democratic Forces.

Early life 
He graduated from "Agricultural Economics," then defended his doctoral dissertation.

Career 
Later, he was a professor at Southwestern University in Blagoevgrad, Bulgaria. He teaches the basics of marketing and agromarketing.

In the period 1991–1994, he was the Deputy Minister of Agriculture. He was an adviser to President Zhelyu Zhelev on agrarian issues. Twice minister of agriculture - in the caretaker government of Reneta Indzhova (1994–1995) and Stefan Sofiyanski (1997). From 1997 to 2002 was chief administrative secretary in the administration of the President of Bulgaria Petar Stoyanov.

The 2011 Bulgarian presidential election was a candidate for president of the Blue Coalition.

In December 2016, the Reformist bloc was commissioned to attempt to form a government, with Hristov speaking hopefully to the media.

References

1955 births
Bulgarian conservatives
Candidates for President of Bulgaria
Living people
Members of the National Assembly (Bulgaria)